Divyang Thakkar is an Indian actor, writer, and director who primarily works in Gujarati cinema.

Early life
Divyang Thakkar was born and raised in Mumbai. His family originates from Mundra town in the Kutch district of Gujarat state. He has studied filmmaking at Whistling Woods.

Career
After acting in a short film titled Kalapaani in 2011, Thakkar received his first major acting role in Gujarati cinema  in the 2012 satire movie Kevi Rite Jaish directed by Abhishek Jain. The movie was a critical and commercial success and is also considered to be a "glimmer of hope" for Gujarati cinema. This led to the actor-director duo partnering again in Bey Yaar (2015) which also became a critical and commercial success. He later acted as one of the six leads in an ALTBalaji web series Boygiri (2017). He has now turned writer-director for Yash Raj Films with Ranveer Singh starrer 2022 movie Jayeshbhai Jordaar.

Personal life
Divyang Thakkar married his Kevi Rite Jaish co-star Veronica Kalpana-Gautam in 2014.

Works

Filmography

Web series

References

External links

Indian male film actors
Year of birth missing (living people)
Living people
Film directors from Gujarat